Daraei F.C. is an Iranian football club based in Tehran, Iran. They currently compete in the Tehran Province league. Daraei has won the Tehran football league three times and the Tehran Hazfi Cup three times.

The club has a long and rich history. It used to be one of Iran's most dominant and powerful football clubs competing with fierce rivals Shahin and Taj (now known as Esteghlal) throughout the 1940s, 1950s and 1960s. The club is now known as Daraei Novin F.C..

Season-by-season

The table below chronicles the achievements of Daraei in various competitions since 1974.

The table below chronicles the achievements of Daraei Novin in various competitions since 2012.

Key

P = Played
W = Games won
D = Games drawn
L = Games lost
F = Goals for
A = Goals against
Pts = Points
Pos = Final position

TJC = Takht Jamshid Cup
TFL = Tehran Football League
TFL2 = Tehran Football League's 2nd Div.
TFL3 = Tehran Football League's 3rd Div.
Div 3 = 3rd Division
TPL = Tehran Province league
TPL.Div 1 = Tehran Province league's 1st Div.

Honours
Tehran Football Championship:
 Champion (4): 1947–1948, 1961–1962, 1962_63,1967–1968
 Runner Up (3): 1965–1966, 1966–1967, 1987–1988

Tehran Hazfi Cup:
 Champion (1): 1956–1957
 Runner Up (1): 1948–1949

 Iran championship cup
 Champion (1): 1962

Qods League
 4th Place: 1989

17th of Shahrivar league
 Runner Up

Managers
Ali Akbar Moheb 1940s
 ... 
Ahmad Tousi (1980–?)
Mehdi Monajati
Jala Talebi
Attila Hejazi (2008)

References

Football clubs in Iran
Sport in Tehran
1936 establishments in Iran